Jay G Blumler (18 February 1924 – 30 January 2021) was an American-British theorist of communication and media. He was Professor of Public Communication at the University of Leeds.

Early life and education
Blumler was born in New York, New York on 18 February 1924.  Blumler's father was a Marxist and his mother a supporter of Roosevelt’s New Deal. He described himself as a "red diaper baby".

In 1947 Blumler graduated from Antioch College, Ohio with the degree of BA in political science.  He subsequently received a DPhil from the University of Oxford.

Military service
Blumler joined the United States Army in 1944 and served as a Russian interpreter in Berlin during the Second World War. As Chair of the American Veterans Committee in Berlin he was invited to have tea with Eleanor Roosevelt when she visited the city. She had heard of some of the charity work that his committee had done and asked to meet them.

Academic career
From 1949 Blumler taught political theory at Ruskin College, Oxford.  In 1963 he was appointed Granada Television Research Fellow at the University of Leeds where in 1966 he established the Centre for Television Research.  He became the University’s first Professor of Public Communication in 1978. 

Blumler retired from his chair at Leeds in 1989 with the title Emeritus Professor.  He continued to publish prolifically as well as teaching for one semester each year at the University of Maryland.

Death
Blumler died in Leeds on 30 January 2021, aged 96.  He was survived by his children Matthew, Luke, Jackie and Mark.  His wife, Gina, died in 2004.

Selected publications
Television in Politics: Its Uses and Influences (1968) with Denis McQuail
The Uses of Mass Communications: Current Perspectives on Gratifications Research (1974) editor with Elihu Katz
The Challenge of Election Broadcasting. Report of an Enquiry by the Centre for Television Research, University of Leeds (1978) with Michael Gurevitch and Julian Ives
La télévision fait-elle l'élection?: Une analyse comparative, France, Grande-Bretagne, Belgique (1978) with Alison Ewbank and Claude Geerts
Communicating to Voters: Television in the First European Parliamentary Elections (1983) editor with Anthony D. Fox
Research on the Range and Quality of Broadcasting Services. A Report for the Committee on Financing the BBC.(HMSO 1986) with Thomas Nossiter, Malcolm Brynin
Wired Cities: Shaping the Future of Communications (1987) editor with William H. Dutton and Kenneth L. Kramer
Broadcasting Finance in Transition: A Comparative Handbook (1991) editor with T. J. Nossiter
The Formation of Campaign Agendas: A Comparative Analysis of Party and Media Roles in Recent American and British Elections (1991) with Michael Gurevitch, Holli A. Semetko, David H. Weaver
Comparatively Speaking: Communication and Culture across Space and Time (1992) editor with Jack M. McLeod, Karl Erik Rosengren
Television and the Public Interest: Vulnerable Values in Western European Broadcasting (1992) editor
The Crisis of Public Communication (1995) with Michael Gurevitch

References

Ellis Cashmore and Chris Rojek, Dictionary of Cultural Theorists, 1999, pp. 75-76
Professor Jay G. Blumler (1924–2021)

1924 births
2021 deaths
Academics of Ruskin College
Academics of the University of Leeds
Alumni of the London School of Economics
American expatriate academics
American expatriates in the United Kingdom
Antioch College alumni